Akbar Badshah (born 15 December 1985) is a Pakistani first-class cricketer who plays for Peshawar.

References

External links
 

1985 births
Living people
Pakistani cricketers
Peshawar cricketers
People from Rajouri district